Lecanora lichexanthoxylina is a species of crustose lichen in the family Lecanoraceae. Found in Maracaju Mountain Range in Mato Grosso do Sul (Brazil), it was formally described as a new species in 2021 by André Aptroot and Maria Fernanda Souza. The specific epithet refers to the presence of lichexanthone, a secondary chemical.

See also
List of Lecanora species

References

lichexanthoxylina
Lichen species
Lichens described in 2021
Lichens of West-Central Brazil
Taxa named by André Aptroot